Mukovnin is a rural locality (a khutor) in Verkhnebuzinovskoye Rural Settlement, Kletsky District, Volgograd Oblast, Russia. The population was 114 as of 2010.

Geography 
Mukovnin is located 50 km southeast of Kletskaya (the district's administrative centre) by road. Verkhnyaya Buzinovka is the nearest rural locality.

References 

Rural localities in Kletsky District